Archway is an area of north London, England, in the London Borough of Islington  north of Charing Cross. It straddles the A1 and is named after a local landmark, the high, single-arched Archway Bridge which crossed the road in a cutting to the north. It has a modern commercial hub around Vantage Point (formerly Archway Tower) and Archway tube station.

History

Toponymy
Archway's name developed in reference to the old bridge carrying Hornsey Lane from Highgate to Crouch End, over the cutting of Archway Road. The original, brick-built, single-arched bridge of 1813 was replaced in 1900 by the current cast-iron Hornsey Lane Bridge. The 1893 Ordnance Survey map shows the bridge simply as "Highgate Archway". A few residents, especially those born and locally raised in the early 20th century, refer to the area with a definite article (as "the Archway").

Seven bus routes in London terminate at 'Archway', the term having become mainstream after the tube station, originally called Highgate, was renamed Highgate (Archway) in 1939, and subsequently Archway (Highgate) in 1941, and Archway in 1947. The ecclesiastical parishes (once having had poor-relief vestries employing highwaymen, for example) before the laws that disestablished their secular components do not mention Archway. Those covering the area are parts of traditional parent parishes named Whitehall Park, Upper Holloway, St John the Evangelist, Upper Holloway and a very small part of a Highgate, Islington parish.

Development
The Archway Road is part of the A1 or Great North Road, one of the original toll roads. From 1813 to 1864, the cutting contained a toll gate, where travellers paid for the next stage of their journey, as is recorded by a plaque at 1 Pauntley Street, an apartment block. Highgate Hill, the road from Archway to Highgate village, was the route of the first motorised cable car in Europe. It operated from 1884 to 1909. Highgate tube station (later renamed 'Highgate Archway' and subsequently just 'Archway') opened on 22 June 1907 as the northern terminus of the Highgate branch of the Northern Line.

Local government
The ancient parish of Islington stretched over three miles from its southern boundary to meet with the parish of Hornsey at its north. The area that became Archway is located at the northwestern part of this parish. The parish was government by the St Mary Islington open vestry. The vestry was incorporated by the Metropolis Management Act 1855 as an administrative vestry and the boundary with Hornsey to the north also became the northern limit of the London metropolitan district.

Governance
Archway is part of the Islington North Parliament constituency. It is mostly in the Islington ward of Junction, which is named after Junction Road and partly in the ward of Hillrise. Each ward elects three councillors to Islington London Borough Council.

Demographics
The demographics of the two wards which Archway falls (predominantly in) are as follows:

The Archway area has the highest percentages of Jews in Islington - at the 2021 Census the Archway East area was 2.9% Jewish, Archway West was 1.6% and Tufnell Park 2.8%. The community is largest in the Whitehall Park area (between Archway, Highgate and Crouch End) which is close to 10% Jewish.

The Junction ward has the 4th highest percentage of White Irish people in wards in London.

Geography

The Whittington Hospital forms a large site in the west of the area. Larger open spaces include Archway Park, Dartmouth Park, Hillside Park and Navigator Square. Archway forms part of the London post town within the N19 postcode district, served from the Royal Mail Upper Holloway Delivery Office.

Archway adjoins Highgate and Crouch End to the north, with Hornsey Lane forming the London Borough of Islington boundary with the London Borough of Haringey. In the west, is Dartmouth Park, with Dartmouth Park Hill forming the boundary with  the London Borough of Camden. To the west of the point where the three boroughs meet at the top of Highgate Hill is Waterlow Park. South of Archway is Upper Holloway and Tufnell Park.

Commercial
Archway market place and Vantage Point, the tallest building in Archway, are next to the tube station.

The photograph for the cover of The Kinks' 1971 album Muswell Hillbillies was taken in the Archway Tavern.

Transport

Rail and Underground
The nearest London Underground station is Archway tube station on the Northern line. The nearest London Overground station is Upper Holloway.

Bus routes
Archway is served by the following bus routes: 4, 17, 41, 43 (24 hour), 134 (24 hour), 143, 210, 263, 271 (24 hour), 390 (24 hour), C11 and W5. Also Night Bus routes N20 and N41.

Culture

Dick Whittington
A legend perpetuated by the name of the hospital and a statue on the older street leading, beside the hospital, to Highgate records Dick Whittington, medieval Mayor of London failing to make his fortune in the city heard the Bow Bells (those of St Mary-le-Bow, a church on Cheapside) from here, a distance of  leading to the later homage "turn again Whittington, thrice Lord Mayor of London", inscribed on the supporting stone protected by railings. On top of the thick tablet, his cat of English folklore is cast in stone. A restored 1821 memorial stone topped with a small statue of Whittington's Cat is known as the Whittington Stone and is next to a pub of the same name on Highgate Hill, a street in Archway. The memorial marks the legendary site where 'Dick Whittington' Sir Richard's folkloric alter ego, returning home discouraged after a disastrous attempt to make his fortune in the city, heard the bells of St Mary le Bow ring out, 'Turn again Whittington, thrice Lord Mayor of London.' Seeing the building of a maternity hospital and drains for the poor of London during his lifetime, he left his wealth to a broad-based charity which continues into the 21st century. Pauntley Street takes its name from the village of Pauntley in the Forest of Dean, Gloucestershire, traditionally regarded as Dick Whittington's birthplace. The Whittington Hospital is also named after him.

Irish population
There has been a large Irish community in the area since the 1830s, before the mass migration of the Great Famine. Many of them worked in building railways and roads and became known as "navigators". After the Second World War, the Irish community formed in the area continued to grow as the newly opened Whittington Hospital recruited nurses from Ireland. Although immigration slowed as the country became more prosperous, the Irish influence on the area can still be seen in pubs such as The Mother Red Cap, the supply of Irish newspapers in local newsagents and the naming of the pedestrian precinct as Navigator Square, after the Irish navigators who built many of the roads in the area.

See also
List of people from Islington
List of bridges in London
The Bomb Factory Art Foundation

References

Districts of the London Borough of Islington
Areas of London
District centres of London